Crows is the seventh studio album by singer/songwriter Allison Moorer. It is her first for new label Rykodisc and sees her reunited with producer R.S. Field for the first time since 2004's The Duel. Moorer wrote 12 of the 13 songs on the album while she was between labels and expecting her first child. Featuring a more intimate sound and recorded in four days in September 2009 with no overdubs, the album earned plenty of acclaim with Slant Magazine writing: "Moorer's performance here is arguably a career best. As a fully realized, heady concept that is all but flawless in its execution, Crows joins Hardest and Duel as the third unqualified masterpiece of Moorer's rich career"  while AllMusic wrote that "Crows is a mature and artful set of keenly intelligent pop tunes from a singer and songwriter determined to avoid easy categorization."

An acoustic EP, titled Crows Acoustic, was released on May 25, 2010 and included six tracks.

Track listing

Personnel
 Richard Bennett - acoustic guitar, electric guitar
 Chris Carmichael - strings, string arrangements
 R.S. Field - drums, acoustic guitar, tambourine
 Brad Jones - bass guitar, vibraphone
 Ken Lewis - percussion
 Joe McMahon - celeste, acoustic guitar, electric guitar, steel guitar
 Allison Moorer - acoustic guitar, piano, Wurlitzer, lead vocals, background vocals

Chart performance

References

2010 albums
Allison Moorer albums
Rykodisc albums